Parasangada Gendethimma is a 1978 Indian Kannada-language drama film directed by Maruthi Shivram, based on a novel of the same by Srikrishna Alanahalli. It stars Lokesh in the lead role and the supporting cast features Reeta Anchan, B. R. Jayaram, and Ramakrishna. The film features original songs composed by Rajan–Nagendra, while cinematography was done by S. Ramachandra.

The film won three awards at the 1978–79 Karnataka State Film Awards – Third Best Film, Best Actor (Lokesh) and Best Music Director (Rajan–Nagendra). The film was remade in Tamil in 1979 as Rosaappo Ravikkai Kaari and in Telugu in 1982 as Kotha Neeru.

Plot 
Thimanna (Lokesh) is an innocent tribal youth who is excited about his wedding. A salesman in village who help villagers by getting their needy items from distant city, His wedding is arranged with Marakani (Reeta Anchan), a city girl. Marakani wants to bring about a huge change in him and make him a decent city man. Meanwhile, due to the differences with her mother-in-law, Marakani manages to separate herself and Thimanna from his mother, and they start living separately. Later in the process, when an innocent Thimanna invites a teacher (Manu) to his new shed where they live, Marakani gets attracted to him due to his sophisticated city man looks and then the plot revolves around Thimanna's point of view of the whole situation.

Cast 
 Lokesh as Gendethimma
 B. R. Jayaram
 Reeta Anchan ( Voice dubbed by B. Jayashree )
 Honnaiah
 Manu
 Shyamala
 Pramila

Soundtrack 
The music for the film was composed by Rajan–Nagendra, with lyrics by Doddarange Gowda.

Track list

References

External links 
 

1978 films
1978 comedy-drama films
1970s Kannada-language films
Indian comedy-drama films
Films scored by Rajan–Nagendra
Films based on Indian novels
Kannada films remade in other languages
1978 comedy films
1978 drama films